The 1930 Tennessee gubernatorial election was held on November 4, 1930. Incumbent Democrat Henry Hollis Horton defeated Republican nominee C. Arthur Bruce with 63.84% of the vote.

Primary elections
Primary elections were held on August 7, 1930.

Democratic primary

Candidates
Henry Hollis Horton, incumbent Governor
Lambert Estes Gwinn, former State Senator

Results

General election

Candidates
Major party candidates
Henry Hollis Horton, Democratic
C. Arthur Bruce, Republican 

Other candidates
Samuel Borenstein, Independent

Results

References

1930
Tennessee
Gubernatorial